The National Monuments of Chile (Spanish: Monumentos Nacionales de Chile) are structures, items and places which are recognized by the National Monuments Council (Consejo de Monumentos Nacionales) for representing the country's cultural heritage. They are all protected by law.

As of June 2012, 1,269 structures, items and places have been recognized as National Monuments of Chile.

Tabular listing

Notes

References

National Monuments of Chile by region
Historic sites in Chile